Negha Shahin (born 1992/1993) is an Indian transgender actor. Born in Tamil Nadu, India. Shahin was forced to leave her natal home at the age of 18 and also dropped out of BTech. She has been living in Chennai ever since and worked with various NGOs that work on transgender rights organizations and currently with Trans Rights Now Collective.

Early life 
Her natal family rejected her when they realized about her identity and they did not want her to stay with them. There was a lot of physically violence too post which she ran away to Chennai with her “Plus Two certificate.”

Career 
Shanin is a trained counsellor and has over a year experience in an NGO called Thozhi where she worked as a mental health counsellor  While working at the NGO, she started modelling and anchoring television shows. She worked as a video jockey working with the Vikatan group of publications.

Her break-through role was in the Malayalam film Antharam which made her the first trans-woman to have won the debut actor at the 52nd Kerala State Film Awards in 2022.

Apart from the Malayalam feature film, she also appeared in over 3 short films namely, Piravi, Manam and Thirunagal.

Future projects 
In an interview with The New Indian Express, Negha said that she was working on a Tamil project titled The Road, which also stars Trisha and Miya George.

References 

Year of birth missing (living people)
Living people
Indian female models
Transgender rights activists
Indian LGBT rights activists
Indian LGBT actors
Indian women activists
Transgender entertainers
Transgender female models
Transgender actresses